"The Unnamed Feeling" is a song by heavy metal band Metallica. It was released on January 12, 2004, as the third single from the band's eighth studio album, St. Anger (2003). The song is about an unnamed feeling (which, according to James Hetfield, is anxiety) that a person feels when they are close to the edge of losing control, just before he or she panics.

Along with a music video, the song was released as a single exclusively to Australia. It was released as part of an E.P. in the UK. The unique video, directed by The Malloys, featured the band performing in a virtually empty room that gradually closed in on them throughout the song. This was accompanied by visual stories of several people all experiencing that "unnamed feeling" in their own way.

The front cover for the basic singles depicts the "monster" from their other St. Anger single, "Some Kind of Monster". However, cover art for the Australia-exclusive CD single for "The Unnamed Feeling" was chosen by Metallica through a contest where Australian fans could submit their own original artwork. The winning piece by Louis Claveria depicts an isolated illustration of a black heart roughly outlined in white with a black background. Claveria's artwork was autographed by the band and framed, and all four finalists were featured in an exclusive poster insert included in the single. Exclusive live B-sides from Metallica's first show at the Big Day Out festival in Gold Coast were featured on the Australian single.

Track listing

Charts

References

2003 songs
2004 singles
Metallica songs
Songs written by James Hetfield
Songs written by Lars Ulrich
Songs written by Kirk Hammett
Songs written by Bob Rock
Music videos directed by The Malloys
Elektra Records singles
Song recordings produced by Bob Rock
Number-one singles in Spain